The Bank Lofts is a building in Denver, Colorado. Constructed in 1921, the building is listed on the National Register of Historic Places.

History 
Originally the US National/Guaranty Bank Building, the Bank Lofts (also known as the United States National Bank Building, US National Bank Building, Guaranty Bank Building) were designed by Arthur Addison Fisher and William Ellsworth Fisher (Fisher & Fisher) and built in 1921. The Fishers also designed other notable Denver landmarks, such as the Denver City Tramway Building at 1100 14th Street and the A. C. Foster Building at 912 16th Street. Located at 817 17th street, the Bank Lofts are a reserved architectural example of the Chicago Commercial style. The 10-story (40.23 meters high) building's façade is covered in smooth ashlar limestone and features an ornamental bronze storefront. In the 1980s, the building sat vacant and was almost demolished, but on March 25, 1994 it was listed on the National Register of Historic Places under the Historic Resources of Downtown Denver Multiple Property Submission (building number: 5DV.5300), and was subsequently renovated in 1995. The renovation costs exceeded $10.9 million, and were financed via historic rehabilitation and low-income housing tax credits and a grant from the Colorado Historical Society, along with TIF assistance from DURA. The building was reconfigured into renter-occupied apartment lofts in 1996.

Today, The Bank Lofts reside in Denver's historic district, located in the heart of downtown Denver next to LoDo and the 16th Street Mall.  It is surrounded by other historic landmark buildings, such as the Boston Building (which has been converted to the Boston Lofts), the American National Bank Building, and the Denver National Bank Building. It currently houses 117 residential apartment lofts, which feature original artistic details and historic characteristics (i.e., crown molding, vaulted ceilings, etc....). The property is owned and managed by Apartment Investment and Management Company – also known as Aimco (stock ticker AIV).

Tenants 
In addition to the apartment lofts, the building houses  of retail space; currently occupied by Bruegger's Bagels, The Magnolia Ballroom, and Three Sisters’ Café and Catering.

Gallery

References

External links
 Bank Loft Apartments

Residential buildings in Denver
National Register of Historic Places in Denver
Commercial buildings completed in 1921
Bank buildings on the National Register of Historic Places in Colorado
Chicago school architecture in the United States
1921 establishments in Colorado